Gilberto S. Valdés (21 May 1905, in Jovellanos, Matanzas – 12 May 1972, in New York City) was a Cuban music director and composer who specialised in the afro genre of Cuban popular music. Valdés was one of the first popular bandleaders to introduce African melody, rhythm and traditional themes into his music. His Afro-Cuban compositions first gained attention in 1935, when Rita Montaner, accompanied by the pianist Rafael Betancourt, presented his songs "Bembé", "Baró", "Tambó" y "Sangre africana" in the Teatro Principal de la Comedia.

Discography
Cuban ballet Orquesta de Cámara de Madrid dir. Gilberto Valdés LP Montilla 92: 
Hi Fi in the tropics LP Montilla 94
Gran Orquesta Típica Nacional LP Puchito SP-114:
Rezo de santo – Ritmo de santo de la tierra de África en Arará.  LP Maype 180
La música del maestro Gilberto Valdés – Con su orquesta LP Panart 3101

See also
Afrocubanismo
Eliseo Grenet

References

1905 births
1972 deaths
Cuban composers
Male composers
People from Matanzas Province
Cuban emigrants to the United States
Cuban male musicians